Chalamera is a municipality located in the province of Huesca, Aragon, Spain. According to the 2004 census (INE), the municipality has a population of 153 inhabitants.

Notable people
Ramón J. Sender (1901–1982), novelist, essayist and journalist

References

Municipalities in the Province of Huesca